Sadovaya is a rural locality (a village) in Starodubsky District, Bryansk Oblast, Russia. The population was 25 as of 2010. There is 1 street.

Geography 
Sadovaya is located 31 km northeast of Starodub (the district's administrative centre) by road. Shershevichi is the nearest rural locality.

References 

Rural localities in Starodubsky District